Góriz or Refuge of Góriz, is a mountain refuge located in the province of Huesca in the Spanish Pyrenees. The hut is a hub of different treks in the area, like GR 11 or Monte Perdido climb. It can host 72 people and is usually full in high season so it is necessary to book in advance.

See also
List of mountains in Aragon
List of Pyrenean three-thousanders

External links
  Normal route and Escaleras route to climb Monte Perdido komandokroketa.org, retrieved 2013-08-20
  "Glaciar de Monte Perdido - Gavarnie and Monte Perdido Massif" swisseduc.ch, retrieved 2013-08-20
 official webpage

Mountain huts in Spain
Mountains of Aragon
Mountains of the Pyrenees